Marko "Supermass" Savolainen (born 13 February 1973) is a Finnish professional heavy-weight IFBB bodybuilder.

Career 
Savolainen, who was born in Oulu, Finland, retired in 2003, but made a comeback in 2006. First Savolainen was keen practitioner of Taekwondo which he began in his early teens and was a multiple master of the sport before becoming interested in bodybuilding.  He won Finnish junior officials in his youth in the sport. He was also promising wrestler in youth heavyweight division. Switching to bodybuilding at age of 16, he weighed 120 kg or 270 lb in on-season shape, and boasted a pumped 24 in. arm. In the off season he weighed 310 lbs. at a height of 5 ft. 9 in. So far in his professional career, his best placing was in the 1997 IFBB Grand Prix Finland, resulting in 7th place. Marko also made a training DVD/video, titled Supermass—Return. In 2007, as a result of kidney failure, Marko left bodybuilding and started training and competing in kickboxing. In late November 2008, doctors said they had found him a kidney donor. He started bodybuilding again, saying he would be a natural bodybuilder, which means no use of anabolic steroids.

Contest history

Records

 Bench press: 260 kg or 575 lb
 Incline Bench press: 8 x 240 kg or 530 lb
 Smith-Squat: 8 x 360 kg or 790 lb
 Biceps curl: 8 x 120 kg or 265 lb

References 
Entry for Marko in the BodybuildingPro.com database

External links 
BODY-magazine interviews Marko (in Finnish)
Marko's blog
Pictures of Marko

See also 
 List of male professional bodybuilders

Finnish bodybuilders
Finnish male weightlifters
Finnish male taekwondo practitioners
Finnish male kickboxers
Finnish male sport wrestlers
Living people
1973 births
Sportspeople from Oulu